The Directors Guild of America Award for Outstanding Directorial Achievement in Comedy Series is one of the annual Directors Guild of America Awards given by the Directors Guild of America. It was first presented at the 24th Directors Guild of America Awards in 1972. The current eligibility period is the calendar year.

Winners and nominees

1970s

1980s

1990s

2000s

2010s

2020s

Programs with multiple wins
8 wins
M*A*S*H (CBS)

3 wins
All in the Family (CBS)
Barry (HBO)
Seinfeld (NBC)
Veep (HBO)

2 wins
Cheers (NBC)
Curb Your Enthusiasm (HBO)
Frasier (NBC)
The Golden Girls (NBC)
Modern Family (ABC)
Murphy Brown (CBS)
Sex and the City (HBO)
Sports Night (ABC)

Programs with multiple nominations

13 nominations
Curb Your Enthusiasm (HBO)
M*A*S*H (CBS)

10 nominations
Cheers (NBC)
Modern Family (ABC)
Sex and the City (HBO)

9 nominations
30 Rock (NBC)
Frasier (NBC)
Seinfeld (NBC)

7 nominations
The Marvelous Mrs. Maisel (Amazon)
Will & Grace (NBC)

5 nominations
All in the Family (CBS)
Entourage (HBO)
The Larry Sanders Show (HBO)
Mary Tyler Moore (CBS)
Murphy Brown (CBS)
Silicon Valley (HBO)
Ted Lasso (Apple TV+)
Veep (HBO)

4 nominations
Maude (CBS)

3 nominations
Atlanta (FX)
Barry (HBO)
The Big Bang Theory (CBS)
Desperate Housewives (ABC)
Glee (Fox)
The Golden Girls (NBC)
Louie (FX)
Mad About You (NBC)
Taxi (ABC/NBC)

2 nominations
Barney Miller (ABC)
Malcolm in the Middle (Fox)
Master of None (Netflix)
Moonlighting (ABC)
Soap (ABC)
Sports Night (ABC)
Transparent (Amazon)
The White Lotus (HBO)
The Wonder Years (ABC)

Individuals with multiple wins
4 wins
James Burrows

3 wins
Alan Alda (2 consecutive)
Bill Hader (2 consecutive)

2 wins
Andy Ackerman (consecutive)
Hy Averback (consecutive)
Paul Bogart (consecutive)
Beth McCarthy-Miller
Gene Reynolds (consecutive)
Jay Sandrich (consecutive)
Thomas Schlamme (consecutive)
Tim Van Patten (consecutive)

Individuals with multiple nominations

21 nominations
James Burrows

8 nominations
Jay Sandrich

6 nominations
Todd Holland
Beth McCarthy-Miller

4 nominations
Alan Alda
Andy Ackerman
Pamela Fryman
Mike Judge
Noam Pitlik
Amy Sherman-Palladino
David Steinberg

3 nominations
Paul Bogart
Larry Charles
Tom Cherones
Louis C.K.
Hal Cooper
Michael Engler
Julian Farino
Bryan Gordon
Bill Hader
Barnet Kellman
Michael Patrick King
Gail Mancuso

2 nominations
Hy Averback
Paris Barclay
Peter Bonerz
Mark Cendrowski
Allen Coulter
Bryan Cranston
 MJ Delaney
Charles S. Dubin
Donald Glover
Terry Hughes
Gordon Hunt
David Lee
Burt Metcalfe
Ryan Murphy
David Nutter
Daniel Palladino
Gene Reynolds
John Rich
Arlene Sanford
Don Scardino
Jeff Schaffer
Thomas Schlamme
Jill Soloway
Michael Spiller
Tim Van Patten
Robert B. Weide
Mike White

Total awards by network
 NBC – 16
 CBS – 13
 HBO – 11
 ABC – 8
 HBO Max – 2
 Amazon Studios – 1
 Fox – 1

References

External links
  (official website)

Directors Guild of America Awards